York Fruits are a brand of fruit-flavoured jellies, traditionally popular in Great Britain at Christmas.

Manufacture
The sweets were formerly made by Terry's of York, and more recently by Kraft Foods (1993-2008) and Smith Kendon in Lancaster (2008-2012). The brand was acquired by Tangerine Confectionery in 2012, which was bought by Valeo Confectionery in 2018.

Sweets
The box contains 200g, or 22 sweets, about the size of chocolates. The sugar-coated jellies are manufactured in circular, half-moon, teardrop and diamond shapes and are flavoured lemon, raspberry, strawberry, mandarin, lime  and cherry.

Notes

References

External links

 Valeo - York Fruits

Brand name confectionery
Yorkshire cuisine